Antonius von Thoma (1 March 1829 – 24 November 1897) was Bishop and later Archbishop of the Archdiocese of München und Freising from 1889 until his death in 1897.

Biography
Thoma was ordained a priest on 29 June 1853 in the Archdiocese of München und Freising, aged 24. His consecrator was Archbishop Antonius von Steichele.

On 24 March 1889, aged 60, he was appointed Bishop of Passau and confirmed two months later, and finally ordained on
28 July 1889.

On 23 October 1889, aged 60, he was appointed as Archbishop of the Archdiocese of München und Freising, confirmed two months later and installed on 21 April 1890.

On 24 November 1897, aged 68, he died in Munich. He had been a priest for 44 years and a bishop for 8 years.

External links

Catholic Hierarchy

1829 births
1897 deaths
Roman Catholic archbishops of Munich and Freising
19th-century Roman Catholic archbishops in Germany
Members of the Bavarian Reichsrat
Burials at Munich Frauenkirche
German Roman Catholic archbishops